The Elmer and Linnie Miller House (89 NE Thompson Street) is an historic house in Portland, Oregon, listed on the National Register of Historic Places. The 1896 Queen Anne-style house in the city's Eliot neighborhood is owned by Walter Cole, the drag queen known as Darcelle XV, as of 2020.

See also
 National Register of Historic Places listings in Northeast Portland, Oregon

References

1896 establishments in Oregon
Houses completed in 1896
Eliot, Portland, Oregon
Houses on the National Register of Historic Places in Portland, Oregon
Northeast Portland, Oregon
Queen Anne architecture in Oregon